Clive Mitchell may refer to:

Clive Mitchell (politician) (1918–2010), Australian politician
Clive Mitchell (EastEnders), fictional character
Clive Mitchell (Benidorm), fictional character
Clive Mitchell (film director), see BAFTA Award for Best Short Film